This is a list of television programs formerly and currently broadcast by the Oprah Winfrey Network.

Original programming

Drama

Co-productions

Continuations

Unscripted

Docuseries

Reality

Talk shows

Acquired programming

Syndicated 
227
Benson
Insecure

Talk shows
The Ellen DeGeneres Show
The Dr. Oz Show
Dr. Phil
The Nate Berkus Show
Rachael Ray
Tamron Hall

News magazine 
20/20 on OWN
Dateline on OWN

Reality
Couples Court with the Coulters

Upcoming programming

Unscripted

Docuseries

In development

Former programming

Drama
Greenleaf (2016–2020)
Queen Sugar (2016–2022)
Love Is (2018)
Ambitions (2019)
David Makes Man (2019–2021)
Delilah (2021)

Comedy
For Better or Worse (2011–2017)
Love Thy Neighbor (2013–2017)
The Paynes (2018)

Soap operas
The Haves and the Have Nots (2013–2021)
If Loving You Is Wrong (2014–2020)

Unscripted

2 Fat 2 Fly
6 Little McGhees
10 Kids 2 Dads
Addicted to Food
All My Children
The Ambush Cook
America's Money Class with Suze Orman
Are You Normal, America?
Ask Oprah's All Stars
Behind Every Man
Belief
Beverly's Full House
Beyond Belief
The Big Holiday Food Fight
Black Love
Black Women OWN the Conversation
Blackboard Wars
The Book of John Gray
Breakthrough with Tony Robbins
Carson Nation
Checked Inn
Commander in Heels
The Customer is Always Right?
Deion's Family Playbook
Deliver Me
The Diamond Collar
The Doc Club with Rosie O'Donnell
The Dr. Laura Berman Show
Don't Tell the Bride
Extreme Clutter with Peter Walsh
Extreme Weight Loss
Fear Not with Iyanla Vanzant
Finding Sarah
Flex & Shanice
Food Fantasies
For Peete's Sake
The Gayle King Show
Girlfriends Check In 
Golden Sisters
Help Desk
Home Made Simple
Houston Beauty
In the Bedroom with Dr. Laura Berman
In Deep Shift with Jonas Elrod
It's Not You, It's Men
Iyanla: Fix My Life
The Judds
Kidnapped by the Kids
Knight Life with Gladys
Life with La Toya
Lindsay 
Lives on Fire
Livin' Lozada
Lost and Found
Love in the City
Love Goals
Lovely Bites
Lovetown, USA
Married to the Army: Alaska
Mind Your Business with Mahisha
Miracle Detectives
Mom's Got Game
My Life Is A Joke
Mystery Diagnosis
NY ER
One Life to Live
Operation Change
Oprah Builds a Network
Oprah Prime
Oprah: Where are They Now?
Oprah's Favorite Things
Oprah's Lifeclass
Oprah's Master Class
Our America with Lisa Ling
OWN Documentary Club
Party at Tiffany's
Police Women of Broward County
Police Women of Cincinnati
Police Women of Dallas
Police Women of Maricopa County
Police Women of Memphis
Raising Whitley
Real Life: The Musical
Released
The Rob Bell Show
Rollin' With Zach
The Rosie Show (2011–12) 
Ryan and Tatum: The O'Neals
Searching For...
Season 25: Oprah Behind The Scenes
Shocking Family Secrets
Staten Island Law
Super Saver Showdown
Super Soul Sessions
Super Soul Sunday
Swell Life 
T.D. Jakes
Tanya's Kitchen Table
To Have & To Hold: Charlotte
Tregaye's Way
Trouble Next Door
TV Guide Magazine's Top 25 Best Oprah Show Moments
The Tyler Perry Show
Undercover Boss
Unfaithful: Stories of Betrayal
Visionaries: Inside the Creative Mind
Wanda Sykes Presents Herlarious
Welcome to Sweetie Pie's
Why Not? with Shania Twain
Your OWN Show: Oprah's Search for the Next TV Star

Notes

References

Lists of television series by network